Amanda Oleander (Rudman) (born December 2, 1989) is a professional contemporary artist. She graduated from the University of North Carolina at Charlotte with a Bachelor of Fine Arts. Oleander started her career creating works for organizations such as artworks for E! Online and Greenpeace. She signed up with Periscope on its second day of launch and has since consistently been one of the app's most popular broadcasters.

Oleander currently lives in Los Angeles illustrating and publishing daily projects, co-hosts a popular podcast series called The Joey and Amanda Podcast (alongside Joey Rudman, son of veteran puppeteer David Rudman), and does workshop collaborations around the world with VISIONARY Projects.

References

External links 
 

Living people
1989 births
Artists from Los Angeles